Porgy & Bess is a 1997 album by the jazz saxophonist Joe Henderson, released on Verve Records. It contains Henderson's arrangements of music from George Gershwin's opera Porgy and Bess. It was his final album as a leader.

Track listing
All music by George Gershwin and all lyrics by Ira Gershwin and DuBose Heyward unless otherwise noted
 "Introduction: Jasbo Brown Blues" – 0:56
 "Summertime" – 7:16
 "Here Come de Honey Man/They Pass by Singin'" – 2:04
 "My Man's Gone Now" – 6:58
 "I Got Plenty o' Nuttin'" – 6:52
 "Bess, You Is My Woman Now" – 5:15
 "It Ain't Necessarily So" (G. Gershwin, I. Gershwin) – 6:27
 "I Loves You, Porgy" – 4:18
 "There's a Boat Dat's Leavin' Soon for New York" – 6:42
 "Oh Bess, Oh Where's My Bess?" – 6:58

Personnel
Joe Henderson – tenor saxophone
Conrad Herwig – trombone
John Scofield – acoustic and electric guitars
Stefon Harris – vibes
Tommy Flanagan – piano
Dave Holland – bass
Jack Dejohnette – drums
Chaka Khan – vocal on track 2
Sting – vocal on track 7

References

1997 albums
Joe Henderson albums
Verve Records albums
Joe Henderson album